Venkojipalem is a locality in Visakhapatanam City in Andhra Pradesh State, India. It belongs to Andhra region. Venkojipalem is divided into New Venkojipalem and Old Venkojipalem.

Features
Durga Nagar (1 km), HB Colony (1 km), Maddilapalem (1 km), Appughar (1 km), and Hanumanthawaka (1 km) are the nearby localities to Venkojipalem.

Commerce
The shopping area is quite old and new can usually fulfill the need of its nearby residents. Shops in the form of free standing rental areas still exist here.

Transport
APSRTC runs the buses to this suburb, connecting it to all parts of the city.

Education
There are a good number of schools and colleges for all budgets.

References

Neighbourhoods in Visakhapatnam